East Camberwell railway station is located on the Lilydale and Belgrave lines in Victoria, Australia. It serves the eastern Melbourne suburb of Camberwell, and it opened on 14 May 1900.

A substation is located north-east of the station, along with a former works depot.

History

East Camberwell station opened on 14 May 1900, and was originally the interchange station for the Deepdene Dasher service, which ran north along the Outer Circle line, that had originally opened in 1891. Three platforms were provided; two high-level platforms for services on the Lilydale line, and a single low-level platform for services on the Outer Circle line. Steps were provided between all platforms, to enable passengers to change between services. Between 1915 and 1922, a signal box at the Melbourne (Up) end was provided, to control the junction towards Riversdale (on today's Alamein line), as the three tracks though to Camberwell had been reduced to two, to allow the regrading works at Camberwell to proceed. On 9 October 1927, the Deepdene Dasher service was withdrawn, and the northern section of the Outer Circle line closed on 6 September 1943, when goods services to East Kew ended. The low level platform was removed after World War II.

In 1964, the platforms on the Lilydale and Belgrave lines were rebuilt, when work to provide a third track between Camberwell and East Camberwell was carried out, with the southern platform converted into an island platform. The track amplification work also removed the bridge that had carried the Lilydale and Belgrave lines over the Outer Circle line. In 1971, the third track was extended to Box Hill.

In 1981, the Edwardian timber station building on Platforms 1 and 2 was replaced with a brick structure, partly due to the perceived fire risk. However, on 12 August 1986, it was destroyed by fire, and was replaced with the current open canopy.

In 1990, actor and comedian Barry Humphries described the station as a "scrawled-on urine-reeking wasteland." Humphries was describing the state of the station at the time.

Platforms and services

East Camberwell has an island platform with two faces and a side platform. All three platforms are linked by an underpass.

It is serviced by Metro Trains' Lilydale and Belgrave line services.

Platform 1:
  all stations and limited express services to Flinders Street
  all stations and limited express services to Flinders Street

Platform 2:
  all stations services to Lilydale
  all stations services to Belgrave

Platform 3:
  weekday all stations services to Lilydale; weekday all stations services to Blackburn
  weekday all stations services to Belgrave; weekday all stations services to Blackburn

References

External links
 Melway map at street-directory.com.au

Further reading
Marc Fiddian (1988). Commuters, Shoppers an Scholars : A History of the Melbourne-Lilyale Railway. p. 76 

Railway stations in Melbourne
Railway stations in Australia opened in 1900
Railway stations in the City of Boroondara